Loyola College is an independent Catholic secondary school, located in Watsonia, a suburb of Melbourne, in Victoria, Australia. The college was founded by the Society of Jesus in 1980 with an initial enrolment of 134 students. The Jesuits conduct the school in the Ignatian tradition.

History 
The Loyola Seminary built between 1932 and 1934 was located at the corner of Bungay and Grimshaw Streets, Watsonia. After being owned by various parties over the years, the land was bought by John Kennedy in 1979, and formally opened as a school the next year.

Structure 
A regional Catholic college, Loyola's associated parishes are St Damian's, Bundoora; Sacred Heart, Diamond Creek; St Mary's, Greensborough; Our Lady of the Way, Kingsbury, St Martin of Tours’, Macleod; St Francis of Assisi, Mill Park and St Thomas’, North Greensborough. The college also serves the parishes of St Francis Xavier, Montmorency, including Holy Trinity, Eltham North and Our Lady Help of Christians, Eltham.

Each staff member and student belongs to one of the six houses: Chisholm, named after Caroline Chisholm; Flynn, named after John Flynn; McAuley, named after the Venerable Mother Catherine McAuley; MacKillop, named after Saint Mary MacKillop; Mannix, named after Archbishop Daniel Mannix; and Xavier, named after St. Francis Xavier. All houses compete with each other through sports, theatre and more, in order to gain the most points and win the House Shield, which is awarded annually.

Past principals 
John Ormond Kennedy was the founding principal in September 1979. Joseph Favrin was the principle from 2008 Until June 2022.

Curriculum 
The college offers a range of subjects including arts, Design and Technology, English, Humanities, Language, Mathematics, Music, Physical and Outdoor Education and Science. Loyola College also offers extra curricular activities including Clubs and Societies, Performing Arts, Public speaking and Debating, Service and Spirituality, and Sport. Major events during the school year include St Ignatius Day, the Musical Production and Dramatic Production, House Drama, House Music, Athletics Carnival and Swimming Carnival.

Sport 
Loyola is a member of the Association of Coeducational School (ACS). Loyola has won the following ACS premierships:

Combined
 Touch Football - 2012

Boys
 Basketball - 2020
 Cricket (2) - 2019, 2020
 Football (3) - 1999, 2001, 2013
 Volleyball (2) - 2002, 2003

Girls
 Basketball (8) - 2003, 2006, 2007, 2008, 2010, 2019, 2021, 2022
 Football (6) - 2008, 2009, 2010, 2011, 2016, 2017
 Futsal (3) - 2016, 2017, 2019
 Netball (4) - 1999, 2005, 2007, 2012
 Soccer (3) - 2016, 2017, 2018
 Softball (4) - 2013, 2014, 2015, 2020
 Tennis (4) - 1998, 2005, 2008, 2014
 Volleyball - 2003

Partnerships 
The school has a partnership with Jesus Good Shepherd School in the Philippines.

Notable alumni 

 Nicholas AudinoMusic producer, songwriter, executive and manager
 Jasmine Curtisactress, dancer, endorser, writer and commercial model
 Jack GrimesAustralian rules football player for Melbourne Demons
 Dylan GrimesAustralian rules football player for Richmond Tigers
 Matthew KreuzerAustralian rules football player for Carlton Blues
 Ben LennonAustralian rules football player for Richmond Tigers
 Alicia Loxleynews reporter
 Richard Muscatracing driver
 Sarah SansonettiAustralian rules football player for Richmond Tigers
 Heath ShawAustralian rules football player for Collingwood Mapgies and GWS Giants
 Rhyce ShawAustralian rules football player for Sydney Swans; coach of North Melbourne Kangaroos
 Jiordan Tollisinger and actress
 Sam PhilpAustralian rules football player for Carlton Blues

See also 

 Catholic education in Australia
 List of non-government schools in Victoria, Australia
 List of Jesuit schools

References 

Educational institutions established in 1980
Catholic secondary schools in Melbourne
1980 establishments in Australia
Jesuit secondary schools in Australia
Buildings and structures in the City of Banyule